Ağçay (known as Vasilyevka until 1992) is a village and municipality in the Khachmaz Rayon of Azerbaijan. Founded in the nineteenth century as an ethnic Russian village, it had a population of 387 as of 2009.

References 

Populated places in Khachmaz District